This is a list of international presidential trips made by Marcelo Rebelo de Sousa, the current President of Portugal.

First term (2016-2021)

2016

2018

2020

Second term (2021- ...)

2021

See also 
 List of international presidential trips made by Aníbal Cavaco Silva
 List of international presidential trips made by António José de Almeida
 List of international presidential trips made by Bernardino Machado
 List of international presidential trips made by Francisco Craveiro Lopes
 List of international presidential trips made by Mário Soares

References 

State visits
State visits by Portuguese presidents
21st century in international relations
Lists of diplomatic trips
Personal timelines